Niveocatharylla is a genus of moths of the family Crambidae.

Species
Niveocatharylla bifasciella (Snellen, 1893)
Niveocatharylla romieuxi Bassi, 1999

References

Crambinae
Crambidae genera